Pine Island Center is an unincorporated community and census-designated place (CDP) located on Pine Island in Lee County, Florida, United States. The population was 1,942 at the 2020 census. It is part of the Cape Coral-Fort Myers, Florida Metropolitan Statistical Area.

Geography
Pine Island Center is located at  (26.633092, -82.122027) on the north-central part of Pine Island. It is bordered to the north by Pineland and Bokeelia and to the south by St. James City. The four communities together comprise all of Pine Island. To the east are Pine Island Creek and Matlacha Pass, and to the west is Pine Island Sound, all arms of the Gulf of Mexico.

The southern edge of Pine Island Center passes through the intersection of County Road 78 (Pine Island Road NW) with County Road 767 (Stringfellow Road).

Demographics

As of the census of 2000, there were 1,721 people, 750 households, and 527 families residing in the CDP. The racial makeup of the CDP was 96.75% White, 1.16% Native American, 0.23% Asian, 1.16% from other races, and 0.70% from two or more races. Hispanic or Latino of any race were 2.44% of the population.

There were 750 households, out of which 23.3% had children under the age of 18 living with them, 57.1% were married couples living together, 9.2% had a female householder with no husband present, and 29.7% were non-families. 23.7% of all households were made up of individuals, and 10.0% had someone living alone who was 65 years of age or older.  The average household size was 2.29 and the average family size was 2.67.

In the CDP, the population was spread out, with 20.3% under the age of 18, 5.3% from 18 to 24, 23.0% from 25 to 44, 29.1% from 45 to 64, and 22.3% who were 65 years of age or older.  The median age was 46 years. For every 100 females, there were 103.7 males.  For every 100 females age 18 and over, there were 101.0 males.

The median income for a household in the CDP was $37,011, and the median income for a family was $46,212. Males had a median income of $26,587 versus $30,357 for females. The per capita income for the CDP was $19,632.  About 1.9% of families and 9.6% of the population were below the poverty line, including none of those under age 18 and 19.0% of those age 65 or over.

References

Census-designated places in Lee County, Florida
Census-designated places in Florida
Populated places on the Intracoastal Waterway in Florida
Pine Island (Lee County, Florida)